Karamyk is a village in the Osh Region of Kyrgyzstan. It is part of the Chong-Alay District. It is on the river Vakhsh (Kyzyl-Suu), in the Alay Valley near the border with Tajikistan. The village is a Kyrgyz-Tajik border crossing on European route E60 (AH65). Its population was 3,324 in 2021.

References

Populated places in Osh Region
Kyrgyzstan–Tajikistan border crossings